Oscar S. Howard was an American football coach.  He was the first head football coach at the University of California, Berkeley, leading the California Golden Bears during a nine-game season played during the winter and spring of 1886.  His 1886 team compiled a record of 6–2–1.

Head coaching record

References

Year of birth missing
Year of death missing
California Golden Bears football coaches